The 2014 Bet-at-home Cup Kitzbühel was a men's tennis tournament played on outdoor clay courts. It was the 70th edition of the Austrian Open Kitzbühel, and part of the World Tour 250 series of the 2014 ATP World Tour. It took place at the Tennis stadium Kitzbühel in Kitzbuehel Austria, from July 27 through August 2.

Singles main draw entrants

Seeds

 1 Rankings are as of July 21, 2014

Other entrants
The following players received wildcards into the singles main draw:
  David Goffin
  Gerald Melzer
  Alexander Zverev

The following players received entry from the qualifying draw:
  Viktor Galović
  Máximo González
  Albert Ramos-Viñolas
  João Souza

Withdrawals
Before the tournament
  Nicolás Almagro
  Carlos Berlocq
  Martin Kližan
  Leonardo Mayer
  João Sousa

During the tournament
  Pere Riba

Doubles main draw entrants

Seeds

 Rankings are as of July 21, 2014

Other entrants
The following pairs received wildcards into the doubles main draw:
  Gerald Melzer  /  Jürgen Melzer
  Thomas Pichl  /  Andreas Seppi

Finals

Singles

  David Goffin defeated  Dominic Thiem, 4–6, 6–1, 6–3

Doubles

  Henri Kontinen /  Jarkko Nieminen defeated  Daniele Bracciali /  Andrey Golubev, 6–1, 6–4

References

External links
Official website

Bet-at-home Cup Kitzbuhel
Austrian Open Kitzbühel
Austrian Open